Le Pétomane is a 1979 British short humorous film based on the life of Le Pétomane, the stage name of the late 19th century French flatulist (professional farter) and entertainer Joseph Pujol who was famous for his remarkable control of the abdominal muscles, which enabled him to seemingly fart at will and whose 'farting' performances at the Moulin Rouge in Paris drove his audiences to hysterics.

Synopsis
Joseph Pujol is a professional farter billed as Le Pétomane who is able to orchestrate his farts to music, to the delight of his Parisian audiences. By ingesting charcoal Pujol is able to generate the gastric gases essential for his stage act. For years he is the Toast of Paris, but with the passing years Pujol loses his muscular control, causing his act to fail in a cacophony of flatulent explosions.

Background
Running at 33 minutes, the film was directed by Ian MacNaughton while the script was written by Galton and Simpson based on Pujol's story and starring veteran comic actor Leonard Rossiter. The cast also included John D. Collins, Michael Cronin, Alexandra Dane, John Harvey, Alun Lewis, Roland MacLeod, Nancy Nevinson, Michael Ripper, Gordon Rollings, Graham Stark and Bob Todd, with narration by Ronald Fletcher.

References

External links
Le Pétomane on the Internet Movie Database

1979 films
1970s historical films
British historical films
British films based on actual events
Films directed by Ian MacNaughton
1970s English-language films
1970s British films